The Historic Places Act 1954 was an act of the New Zealand Parliament. It established the New Zealand Historic Places Trust (now Heritage New Zealand) for the purpose of preserving, marking and recording places of historic interest in New Zealand.

One of the early structures that was covered by a heritage order was the Pencarrow Head Lighthouse at the entrance to Wellington Harbour, which was added to the register at its centenary in 1959.

References

Statutes of New Zealand
Historic preservation legislation
Heritage New Zealand
1954 in New Zealand law